Below is list of exonyms of Romanian language, or exonym-words for places outside Romania and Republic of Moldova.  Most of them shall keep the original writing, unless not using Latin alphabet:

Albania

Berat Vâlea
Boboshticë Bubușița

Grabovë e Sipërme Gravia
Gjirokastër Liurocastru
Korçë Curceaua

Sarandë Saranta

Shkallë Scară

Shkodër Scutari
Vithkuq Bituci
Voskopojë Moscopole
Xarrë Zara

Austria
Bregenz Avriga
Graz Grație (rare)

Linz Lenția (rare) 

Villach Vilac 

Wien Viena, Beci (obsolete)

Counties (județe)
Kärnten Cartania
Steiermark Știria
Tirol Tirulea

Bulgaria

Vidin Diiu (obsolete)
Bregovo Bregova (obsolete)
Dobrich Bazargic (obsolete)
Gamzovo Gâmzova, Gânzova
Kosovo, Vidin Province Cosova
Kudelin Racovița
Mayor Uzunovo Alvadgii
Nikopol Nicopole
Novo Selo, Vidin Province Novosăl
Oryahovo Rahova
Pleven Plevna
Rabrovo Rabova
Rousse Rusciuc (obsolete)
Svishtov Sviștov, Șiștova (obsolete)
Silistra Dârstor (obsolete)
Vrav Vârf
Gomotartsi Gumatariti
Smurdan Smârdan
Byala Slatina Slatina Albă (obsolete)

Durostor County (Județul Durostor)

Silistra Dârstor (county capital)
Alekovo Ghiulerchioi
Alfatar Alfatar
Antimovo Antimova
Aydemir Aidemir, Aidenur
Babuk Babuc
Bashtino Pitracli
Belitsa Belica
Bistra Acbunar
Bogdantsi Uzimge-Orman
Bogorovo Gramoste
Boil Emiler
Bosna Bozna
Bradvari Baltgiul Nou
Brenitsa Caramehmetler
Cherkovna Ciocovna
Chernik Caralar
Chernogor Caradârlar
Chernolik Caraesichioi
Chukovets Tocmachioi
Davidovo Dautlar
Dichevo Chemalchioi
Dobrotitsa Haschioi
Dobrudzhanka Chiutiucli
Dolets Deremahle
Dolno Ryahovo Rahova de Jos
Dulovo Acadânlar, Accadânlar, Inatra-Mahle
Dunavets Spanciova
Garvan Garvan-Cioara
Glavan Alifaci, Alifacî
Glavinitsa Asfatechioi, Asvatechioi
Golesh Chiose Aid, Chiose Aidin
Gospodinovo Nadâr Celebi
Grancharovo Hasan Facâ
Kalipetrovo Calipetrova
Kalugerene Hagiolar
Kamentsi Cairac, Cairuc
Kaynardzha Cainargeaua Mică
Kazmir Cazimir, Cazemir
Kolarovo Arabagilar
Kolobar Bellerchioi
Kosara Cusuiul Turcesc
Kozyak Checiler-Mahle
Kranovo Cranova
Kutlovitsa Oluclii
Listets Mesimler
Lyuben Caravelichioi
Madrevo Mesim-Mahle
Malak Preslavets Cadichioi
Mezhden Sinirul Nou, Sunureni
Nova Cherna Turcșmil
Nova Popina Hogeachioi
Nozharevo Musutlar
Okorsh Musular
Oven Caracoci
Padina Daulgilar
Paisievo Doccelar
Podles Sargilar
Polkovnik-Cholakovo Caibunar, Caibular
Polkovnik-Lambrinovo Frașari
Polkovnik-Taslakovo Baharchioi
Polyana Jali-Ceatalgea
Popina Popina, Popind
Popkralevo Ghiurghengic
Poprusanovo Aratmagea
Poroyno Caraiamurlar, Poroino
Posev Echengic
Pozharevo Cusuiul din Vale
Pravda Dogrular
Preslavtsi Engechioi
Profesor-Ishirkovo Cocina
Prohlada Cirecci
Razdel Ormanchioi
Ruyno Câzâlburum
Sarpovo Saneci
Sekulovo Uzuchioi
Shumentsi Daidâr
Silistra Silistra, (Durostor / Dârstor)
Sitovo Doimușlar
Skala Ceid-Ali Facâ
Slatina Capacli / Slatina
Smilets Caraomur
Sokol Atmăgeaua Tătăreasca
Sratsimir Srazimir, Caraorman
Srebarna Srebârna
Sredishte Bei Bunar
Staro Selo Satu Vechi
Stefan Karadzha / Kosara Amatlar
Strelkovo Topci
 Emirchioi
Svetoslav Cainargeaua Mare
Syanovo Senova
Tarnovtsi Sarighiol
Terter Covangilar
Tsar Asen Țar Asen
Tsar Samuil Țar Samuil
Tsarev Dol Vischioi
Tutrakan Turtucaia
Valkan Curt Palar
Varbino Sucuiuciuc
Varnentsi Denizler
Vasil Levski Pandâcli
Vetren Vetrina
Vodno Suiuciuc
Vokil Sungurlar
Voynovo Cociular
Yarebitsa Ciler, Chiller
Yastrebna Atmagea
Yordanovo Golebina Ceatalgea
Zafirovo Sarsânlar
Zaritsa Camerler
Zarnik Zarnici
Zebil Canipe
Zlatoklas Balabunlar
Zvenimir Avdular

Caliacra County (Județul Caliacra)

Dobrich Bazargic (county capital)
Abrit Aptat, Abrid
Albena Albena
Altsek Chesegic, Alcec
Angelariy Soiacli
Balchik Balcic
Balkantsi Ionușcilar
Batovo Ceatalor
Belgun Duranlar
Benkovski Echișcea, [Maria Luiza]
Bezhanovo Bejenri
Bezmer Avdula
Bezvoditsa Sususchioi
Bilo Surtuchioi
Bistrets Paragic
Bobovets Veischioi
Bogdan Bogdanova
Bonevo Coiumluchioi
Bozhan Bairam Bunar
Bozhanovo Chiramet
Bozhurets Mihăileni
Bozhurovo Nastradin
Branishte Curugiachioi
Brestnitsa Caraciul Mare
Bryastovo Tartamus
Bulgarevo Ghiaur Suiuciuc
Chelopechene Celopecene, Elibei
Cherna Enigea
Chernomortsi Ismail
Chernookovo Cernăuc, Carnaoco
Chestimensko Sougiac
Dabovik Haramanlâc
Debrene Cuiungiuc
Dobrevo Germanei-Ali Anife
Dobrin Camilarul
Dolen Izvor Musubei
Dolina Arnaut Cuius
Donchevo Gara Bogdanova
Draganovo Semis Ala
Dropla Dropia
Dryanovets Regep Cuius
Dubrava Dăbrava
Durankulak Răcari [Duranculac]
Efreytor-Bakolovo Baraclar
Enevo Ezadge
Ezerets Sătlămăși
Gaber Ghiurghenli
Gechanovo Conac
General Kantadzhievo Vânători
General Kolev Ceair Arman
General Toshevo Casim (Ion Gheorghe Duca)
Glavantsi Djami-Mahle
Golyama Smolnitsa Ceamurlia Mare
Goritsa Gorița
Gorichane Pădureni
Gorun Unirea
Gradini Tarpali
Gradinitsa Pirlichioi
Granichar Vâltoarea
Gurkovo Rasoviceni
Guslar Chidirasac
Hadzhi Dimitar Hagi Dimitru
Hrabrovo Hamzalar
Irachek Chioluc
Kableshkovo Pașa Balâ
Kalina Călina
Kamen Seidali
Kamen Bryag Stânca
Kapinovo Melecler
Kapitan Dimitrovo Cadiul
Karapelit Stejarul
Kardam Arman Tasnec
Karvuna Cărvuna / [Cuiuchioi]
Kavarna Cavarna, (Caliacra)
Kladentsi Pîrlionova
Kochmar Cociumar
Kolartsi Arabagi
Koltentsi Bucureni
Konare Selim Cuius
Koriten Hardali
Korkut Strachil
Kozloduytsi Osman Facâ
Kraguevo Sahangi
Kraishte Enigea-Haidar
Kranevo Ecrene
Krapets Carapcea
Krasen Carali
Kremena Carainpular, Orta-Mahle
Krupen Irigea
Krushari Armutlia
Krushevo Crușova
Lomnitsa Malanova
Lovchantsi Carasular
Lozenets  Carabalar
Loznitsa Pădureni
Lyaskovo Fândacli
Lyulyakovo Liliacova
Mali izvor Acbunarul Mic
Malina Malinova, Curumahle
Malka Smolnitsa Ceamurlia Mică
Metodievo Chiopeler
Miladinovtsi Denicler
Mogilishte Iuzghiubeulac
Naveno Suruchioi
Neykovo Caralar
Nova Kamena Sahinlar
Obrochishte Teche
Odartsi Istaccilar
Odrinci Eni-Mahle
Ognyanovo Nadeide
Ograzhden Hasarlâc
Onogur Sarnebi Iurtluc
Orlova Mogila Serdiment
Orlyak Trupcilar
Ovcharovo Durgut Calfa
Paskalevo Ezibeiu
Pastir Cioban Cuius
Pchelarovo Prisǎcani
Pchelnik Covanlâc
Petleshkovo Gherzalar
Pisarovo Pisarava
Plachidol Aliciul Mare
Plenimir Salaman
Podslon Conac Cuiungiuc
Polkovnik-Dyakovo Azarplar
Polkovnik-Savovo Duștubac
Polkovnik-Sveshtarovo Baș-Bunar
Poprigorovo Velifacâ
Popgruevo Cogcolar
Poruchik-Chunchevo Iasagilar
Poruchik-Kurdzhievo Parǎul Caprei
Preselentsi Preselenți
Prilep Ciucurova
Prisad Hagiligichioi
Profesor-Zlatarski Asa-Mahle
Prolez Ghiorman
Rakovski Racovschi [Crișana]
Ravnets Perifaci
Riltsi Suiuciuc
Rogachevo Cheiciler
Rogozina Rogojina
Rosen Saldu Alde
Rosenovo Carasinan
Rositsa Fundeni, [Saragea]
Sarnets Carageat
Sarnino Sernino
Seltse Malcoci
Senokos Ceairlighiol
Septemvriytsi Cloșca
Severtsi Mursalchici
Shabla Șabla
Sirakovo Siracova
Slaveeevo Toccilar
Sliventsi Iurghicicler
Smin Sara Musa
Smolnitsa Ceamurlia de Mijloc
Snop Esetlii
Snyagovo Caragaci
Sokolovo Vulturești
Sotirovo Chiringi
Spasovo Spasova
Sredina Sredina
Staevtsi Hotarele
Stefan Karadzha Voinești
Stefanovo Aj-Orman
Stozher Balagea
Sveti Nikola Sfîntu Niculae
Svoboda Mansurova
Telerig Hasi Chioseler
Tervel Curtbunar, Curt Bunar
Topola Suiuciucul Turcesc
Travnik Laplagea, Taplagea
Trigortsi Geaferli-Iuciorman
Tvarditsa Calaigidere
Tyanevo Bazaurtul de Mijloc
Tyulenovo Cǎlǎcoichioi
Uzovo Uzlari
Vaklino Caramanlâ
Vasilevo Vasileva
Vedrina Cadievo, Vetrina
Velikovo Velicova
Vicheevo Huseinchioi
Vichovo Viceva
Vidno Ghiore
Vladimirovo Vladimirești
Voynikovo Bejuc, Voinicova
Vrachantsi Ceacarcea, Ceacarcia
Vranino Gargalâc
Yavkovo Ciufut-Cuius
Zagortsi Cocargea
Zahari-Stoyanovo Brazda
Zarnevo Chilicadi
Zementsi Ergi
Zhiten Bogdali-Ceamurli
Zhitnitsa Bazaurtul Mic [Bazaurturile Mic]
Zimnitsa Stâna Cadânei
Zlatiya Caramurat
Zmeevo Șerpeni
Zograf Casapli, Zogra

Cyprus
Cyprus Cipru
Ammochostos-Gazimağusa Famagusta
Lefkosia-Lefkoșa Nicosia
Limassol Limasol
Paphos Papus

Croatia

Croatia Croația
Bale Vale
Brdo Bârdo
Cattun Cǎtun
Cicerani Cicerani
Dubrovnik Raguza (obsolete)
Grobnik Grobnic
Jesenovik Sucodru
Kostrčani Costârcean
Krk Veglia
Letaj Letai
Negri Negri
Nova Vas Noselo
Perasi Perasi
Pula Pola
Romanija Romania
Rumeni Români
Škopljak Scopliac
Šušnjevica Susnievița
Vlahi Vlahi
Vlašca Vlașca
Žejane Jeiǎn

Czech Republic

Czech Republic Cehia
Valašská Bystřice Bistrița Română
Valašské Klobouky Pălăriile
Valašské Meziříčí Mezeriș (Mezerișul Român)
Rusava Rusava
Brumov-Bylnice Bilnița Brună
Frenštát pod Radhoštěm
 Jarcová Iarcova
Rožnov pod Radhoštěm
 Bystřička Bistrița Moravă
Hranice Hranițe
Praha Praga

Counties (județe)

Moravian Wallachia Vlahia Moravă

Denmark
Denmark Danemarca
København Copenhaga

Estonia
Tallinn Talin

France
France Franța
Marseille Marsilia
Nice Nișa
Lille Insula
Brest, France Brizania

Germany
Germany Germania
Bremen Brema
Dresden Dresda
Hannover Hanovra
Köln Colonia (obsolete)
Konstanz Constanța
Leipzig Lipsa (obsolete)
Mainz Maiența (obsolete)

Greece

Greece Grecia
Almopia Nânta
Archanghelos Oșani
Athina Atena
Kerkyra Corfu
Crete Creta
Ioannina Ianina
Karpi Țărnareca
Koupa Cupa
Lagkadia Lugunța
Metsovo Aminciu
Piraefs Pireu
Perikleia Birislav
Perivoli Perivoli
Skra Liumnița
Thessaloniki Salonic, Sărună (very rare)

Counties (județe)

Great Wallachia Vlahia Mare

See Megleno-Romanian exonyms

Hungary

Hungary Ungaria

Álmosd Almoșd, or Alimoșd
Apátfalva Patfal, Apatfalǎu
Bagamér Bogomir
Bakonszeg Bacaia
Baktalórántháza Nir Bacta
Balmazújváros Bâlmașuivăroș, or Balmaș Uivăraș
Békés Bichiș
Békéscsaba Bichișciaba, Ciaba
Berettyo Barcău, or Beretău
Berkesz Berchiș
Battonya Bătania
Bedő Bedeu
Berettyóújfalu Ifalău, Uifalău
Biharkeresztes Cheresteșu Bihorului, Cresteș, or Episcopia Bihorului-Crâstieș
Biharnagybajom Boianumare
Borsod Borșod
Budapest Budapesta
Csenger Cinghir
Csengerújfalu Uifalău
Csongrád Cion or Ciongrad
Csorvás Ciorvaș
Darvas Darvaș
Debrecen Debrețin, Dobrițân
Derecske Drișca
Deszk Deșc
Dévaványa Devǎnești
Dombegyház Dâmbighaz, Dămbegi
Elek Aletea
Eperjes Eperieș
Esztár Istar
Esztergom Strigoniu
Fehérgyarmat Giarmatu Alb
Füzesgyarmat Fizeș-Iermata
Gégény Gheghieni
Gyomaendrőd Gioma
Győrtelek Giurtelec
Gyula Giula, Jula (alternative: Ghiula)
Hajdúböszörmény Sântgheorghe, Beșermeni
Hajdúdorog Haidudorog
Hajdúnánás Haidunanaș
Hajdúszoboszló Haidusăbăslău, or Haidu-Soboșlău (old)
Hódmezővásárhely Ionești / Hodmezo Vașarhei (old)
Karcag Cârceag
Kardos Cardoș
Kétegyháza Chitighaz or Chitigaz, Sfânta Ana
Kismarja Chișmaria
Kistelek Chistelec
Kisújszállás Salașul Nou
Kisvárda Varda
Kiszombor Zamborul Mic, or Zamboruimic
Komádi Comad
Kondoros Condoros
Körösladány Ladani de Criș
Körösszakál Sǎcal
Körösszegapáti Apateu, Apateul de Criș
Köröstarcsa Tarcia Crișului
Kötegyán Cheteghian, Ghian
Kunágota Cunagota
Kunszentmárton Kun Sânmărtin (old)
Létavértes Leta Mare
Lőkösháza Leucușhaz, Leucusa
Magyarcsanád Cenad, Cenadul or Cenadu Unguresc
Magyarhomorog Homorogu Unguresc or Homorogul Unguresc
Makó Macău
Máriapócs Pociu
Medgyesbodzas Boziaș
Medgyesegyháza Megieșhaz
Méhkerék Micherechi
Mezőberény Câmpulung Crișănean, Bereni
Mezőgyán Mezoghian
Mezőhegyes Mezoheghieș, Mezigheș
Mezőkovácsháza Cǎuǎcihaz
Mezőpeterd Peterd
Mezősas Pusta Cărmăjdului
Mezőtúr Mezotur
Mindszent Mindsenta, Mindsent
Mikepércs Micuș
Miskolc - Mișcolț
Nagyecsed Eceda Mare, Escedul mare
Nagylak Lacu mare, Nădlac or Nădlacu Unguresc
Nagyrábé Rabei
Nyíracsád Nir Aciad
Nyíradony Nir Adon, Adoni
Nyírbátor Nir Bǎtor
Nyírbéltek Nir Beltec
Nyíregyháza Mestecănești
Nyírlugos Nir Lugoș
Nyírmártonfalva Martonfalău
Ópályi Paliu vechi
Orosháza Oroș, Oroșhaza
Okány Ocani
Pécs Beci
Penészlek Peneslec
Pocsaj Pocei or Poceiu, Poce, Pociu
Porcsalma Porcialma
Poroszló Porosliu
Püspökladány Ladanii
Pusztaottlaka Otlaca-Pustă, Pusta Otlăcii
Sáp Săp
Sarkad Șǎrcad, Șercad, Șecard
Sarkadkeresztúr Crâstor
Sarkash Polaș
Szarvas Cerbul, Sarvaș or Cerbu
Szamosszeg Sameșu Sec
Szeged Seghedin
Székely Săchei
Szentendre Sfântul Andrei
Szentes Sântamǎria / Zenta (old)
Szeghalom Cuieni
Székesfehérvár Alba Regalǎ
Szentpéterszeg Sânpetru
Szolnok Solnoc/Solnoca
Telekgerendás Gerenaș
Tiszaföldvár Feldioara Tisei
Tiszafüred Orveni or Orvenii
Tiszaszőlős Soloșu Tisei
Tiszavasvári Buda Sântmihai
Törökszentmiklós Sânmiclăuș Turcesc
Tótkomlós Tot Comlăuș or Totcomloș
Túrkeve Turchevia, Turcheve
Újfehértó Grigorești / Fehertău Nou (old)
Újiráz Irez
Újkígyós Uichighioș or Chideuș
Újléta Leta nouă
Vámospércs Vama Perții
Vekerd Vecherd
Vésztő Viștea
Zsadány Jadani
Zsáka Jaca

Counties (județe)

Szabolcs-Szatmár-Bereg Săbolciu
Hajdú-Bihar Biharia
Békés Bichiș
Csongrád Cion

Israel
Bethlehem Betleem, Viflaim (obsolete)
Caesarea Cezarea
Yerushalaim (Hebrew), Jerusalem (English): Ierusalim
Lod Lida (obsolete)
Nazareth Nazaret

Italy
Italy Italia
Firenze Florența
Venezia Veneția

Jordan
Jordan Iordania

Latvia
Latvia Letonia, Livonia (very rare)

Lithuania
Lithuania Lituania, Litvania (obsolete)

Macedonia

Bitola Bituli, Bitolia
Burgaraca Itadava
Kruševo Crușuva (Aromanian), Crușova
Ohrid Ohrida
Skopje Scopia (obsolete)

Counties (județe)

See Megleno-Romanian exonyms

Montenegro
Munte Negru
Podgorica Podgorița

Netherlands
Netherlands Țările de Jos, Olanda (informal)
Den Haag Haga
Friesland Frizia

Poland

Polska     Polonia
Kalisz Setidava
Gdańsk Gedania
Kraków Cracovia
Poznań Posnania
Przemyśl Peremislia
Rzeszów Resovia
Tarnów Tarnovia
Toruń Turnu
Warszawa Varșovia
Wrocław   Breslavia, Vratislavia (rare)

lands:
Galicja Galiția, Halici
Kaszuby Cașubia, Pomerelia
Kujawy Cuiavia
Małopolska Polonia Mică
Mazowsze Mazovia
Mazury Mazuria
Podlaskie Podlasia
Podole Podolia
Polesie Polesia
Pomorze Pomerania, Pomoria
Pomorze Wschodnie Pomerelia
Śląsk Silezia
Warmia Varmia
Wielkopolska Polonia Mare
Wołyń Volinia

rivers:
Wisła Vistula
Warta Varta

Portugal
Portugal Portugalia
Lisboa Lisabona

Russia
Russia Rusia
Moskva Moscova, Moscu (obsolete)
Sankt Peterburg Sankt Petersburg

Serbia

Voivodina
For the places in Vojvodina : 

Aradac Bencec
Bač Baci
Banatska Dubica Mărghita Mică
Banatska Palanka Palanca
Banatska Topola Topolia
Banatski Brestovac Berestoc
Banatski Despotovac Ernahaz
Banatski Karlovac Corneni
Banatski Monoštor Canicea Mănăștur
Banatsko Aranđelovo Oroslamoș
Banatsko Karađorđevo Pâmeaora
Banatsko Novo Selo Satu Nou
Banatsko Veliko Selo Sfântul Hubert
Baranda Băranda
Barice Barite, Sân Ianăș
Bašaid Bășăid
Bavanište Bavaniște
Begejci Torac
Bečej Becei
Bela Crkva Biserica Albă
Belo Blato Ersenbetlac
Boka Boca
Bočar Bocsar
Botoš Botoș
Crepaja Cerepalia
Čenta Centa, Țenta
Čestereg Cestereg
Čoka Cioca
Deliblato Deliblata
Đala Giala, Ghiala
Dobrica Dobrița
Dolovo Doloave
Dubovac Dubovăț
Dupljaja Varalia
Ečka Ecica, Iecica Română
Elemir Nemetelemer
Farkašdin Fărcășdia, Farcaș
Gaj Gaiul, Galia
Glogonj Glogoni
Grebenac Grebenaț
Hajdučica Haiducița
Iđoš Highiș de Tisa
Idvor Idvor
Ilandža Ilangea, Ilancea
Izbište Izbiște, Isbiște
Jablanka Iablanca
Jabuka Iabuca
Jankov Most Iancăid, Iancahida, Iancov Most
Jarkovac Iarcovaț
Jaša Tomić Modoș
Jasenovo Iasenova
Jazovo Iosefova
Kajtasovo Gaitasol
Kikinda Chichinda Mare
Klek Clec
Konak Conac, Canac
Kovačica Covăcița
Kovin Cuvin, Cubin
Kumane Cuman
Kusić Cusici
Kuštilj Coșteiu
Lokve Locve, Sânmihai
Majdan Maidan Unguresc
Mali Žam Jamu Mic
Malo Središte Srediștea Mică
Margita Mărghita
Markovac Marcovăț
Međa Pardani
Melenci Melența, Melenci
Mesić Mesici
Mihajlovo Sân Mihai Unguresc
Mokrin Mocrin
Mramorak Mramorac, Maramorac
Nakovo Nacofola, Nacova
Neuzina Nezeni
Nikolinci Nicolinți
Nova Crnja Cernea Ungurească
Novi Bečej Becșa, Araci
Novi Kneževac Noul Cnezat, Canicea
Novi Kozjak Văliug
Novo Miloševo Beorda
Omoljica Omolița
Opovo Opovo, Opava
Orešac Oreșaț
Orlovat Orlovaț
Ostojićevo Sânmiclăușul de Tisa
Padej Padeș
Pančevo Panciova
Parta Parta
Pavliš Păuliș
Perlez Perlas
Plandište Plandiște
Pločica Plosița, Ploșici
Potporanj Porani
Radojevo Clari
Ritiševo Râtișor
Sajan Soian
Sakule Sacula
Samoš Samoș
Sanad Cianad
Sečanj Seceani, Seciani
Sefkerin Sechereni, Sefcherin, Zevcherin
Seleuš Seleuș
Senta Zenta
Siget Sighetul Torontal
Sočica Sălcița
Srpska Crnja Cernea Neamț
Srpski Itebej Itebe
Starčevo Tarciu
Stari Lec Oleci
Straža Straja
Sutjeska Sărcea, Sărcia
Šurjan Sarian
Taraš Taroș
Toba Toba
Tomaševac Tomașevaț
Torak Torac
Torda Turda
Turija Turia
Uljma Ulma
Uzdin Ozora, Uzdin
Vatin Vatina
Velika Greda Georgehaza
Velike Livade Livada Mare
Veliki Gaj Gaiul Mare
Veliko Središte Srediștea Mare
Vladimirovac Pătrovăsâla, Vladimirovăț
Vlajkovac Vlaicovăț
Vojlovica Ertelendi
Vojvodinci Voivodinț
Vršac Vârșeț
Zagajica Furieș
Zrenjanin Becicherecul Mare, Zrenianin
Žitište Jitiște

Valea Timocului
For the places in the Timok Valley (Valea Timocului) or other parts of Serbia:

Beograd Belgrad
Vojvodina Voivodina
Bor Bor
Bela Palanka Aiadava
Brnjica Bârnița
Despotovac Despotovăț
Golubac (Timoc) Golubǎț, Golumbei, Columbaci
Jelašnica Ielașnița
Kladovo Claudia
Lješnica Leșnița
Melnica Melnița
Negotin Nigocin (Negotin)
Niš Niș
Petrovac Petrovăț
Požarevac Podu Lung or Pojarevăț
Pančevo (Vojvodina) Panciova
Ranovac Ranovǎț
Rajac Rajăț
Repušnica Repușnița
Šarbanovac Șarbanovǎț
Smederevo Semendria
Topolovnik Topolovnic
Velika Plana Plana Mare
Veliko Gradište Grădiștea Mare
Vršac (Vojvodina) Vârșeț
Zagubica Jagubița
Zaječar Zaicear, Zăiceri/Zăii-cer (archaic)

Counties (județe)

Pomoravlje District Morava
Podunavlje District Semendria
Zaječar District Zăiceri
Braničevo District Braniceva

Slovakia

Slovakia Slovacia
Bratislava Pojon (obsolete)
Košice Cașovia (obsolete)
Lukov Dorna
Veľké Kapušany Cäpușanii Mari
Zemplín Susudava
Trnava Tarnava

Switzerland
Switzerland Elveția
Bern Berna
Genève Geneva
Luzern Lucerna

Syria
Syria Siria
Damascus Damasc
Aleppo Alep

Turkey
Turkey Turcia
Edirne Adrianopol (obsolete)
Istanbul Constantinopol (obsolete), Țarigrad (obsolete/Slavonic "City of Emperors"), Stambul (slang)
Kırklareli Salmidesia (from Latin 'Salmydessus')
Iznik Niceea (obsolete)

Ukraine

For the places in Ukraine : 

Ukraine Ucraina
Zaporozhye Zaporojia
Volodymyr-Volynskyi Volodîmîr-Volînskîi
Odesa Odiseea

Northern Bessarabia, Northern Bukovina and Pokuttia
Bila Krynytsya Fântâna Albă
Boiany Boian
Chernivtsi Cernăuți
Chornivka Cernăuca
Chotyn Hotin
Hertsa Herța
Hlyboka Adâncata
Kitsman Cozmeni/Cosmini
Kolomyia Colomeea
Krasnoilsk Crasna-Ilschi
Kuty Cuturi
Novoselytsia Sulița Nouă
Sokyriany Târgu Secureni
Storozhynets Storojineț
Vashkivtsi Vășcăuți
Voloka Voloca
Vyzhnytsia Vijnița

Northern Maramureș
Berehove Bereg
Dubove Dâmbu
Khust Hust
Mukachevo Muncaciu
Rakhiv Rahău
Solotvyno Slatina, Ocna Slatina
Tiachiv Teceu Mare
Vinogradiv Seleușu Mare

Transnistria
Kamianets-Podilskyi Camenița
Podilsk Birzula
Mohyliv-Podilskyi Moghilău
Ananiv Ananiev
Kodyma Codâma
Ochakiv Cetatea Neagră, Oceacov
Balta Balta
Bershad Berșad
Pervomaisk, Mykolaiv Oblast Golta
Zhmerynka Șmerinca

Southern Bessarabia (Budjak)

Bilhorod-Dnistrovskyi Cetatea Albă
Izmail Smil, Ismail
Kilia Chilia Nouă
Reni Reni
Sarata Sărata
Tarutyne Tarutina
Tatarbunary Tătărăști (Tatarbunar)
Vylkove Vâlcov
Bajraki Ternavka Târnǎuca
Balamutivka Balamuta
Baniliv-Pidgonirnij Bǎnila pe Siret
Bedevlia Bedeu
Berhomet Berhomete pe Siret
Bilky Bilchi
Bila Cerkva Biserica Albǎ
Čerepkivci Cerepcăuți
Danilove Dǎnilești
Dankivci Dǎncǎuți
Dersca Gaferfcu
Dinivci Dinǎuți
Dolišnij Šepit Șipocele
Dovghe Dolha
Dovgopillja Câmpulung pe Ceremuș
Dračinci Drǎcineț
Dragove Drǎgoiești
Dulove Dulești
Frunzivca Frunze
Golosina Holoșina
Gorincove Herincea
Hiža Tarna Micǎ
Iljnica Ilnița
Jablunica Iablonița
Jasinja Frasini
Kadubivci Cǎdubești
Kaliny Cǎlinești
Karapčiv Carapciu
Karapčiv-Siret Carapciu pe Siret
Kelmentsi Chelmenți
Khriatska Hreațca
Kiseliv Chisǎlǎu
Kliškivci Clișcǎuți
Kobilecka Poljana Poiana Cobâlea
Koločava Cǎlacea de Jos
Korčivci Corcești
Koroleve Craia
Kostinci Costești
Koteliv Cotelău
Kozyrjany Cozǎreni
Krasnie Ocny Ocna Roșie
Kušnica Cușnița
Lipovets Lipovăț
Łukivci Lucavǎț
Lukovica Lucovița
Luzany Lujeni
Lviv Liov
Lyubasiivka Liubașovca
Magala Mahala
Mamalyga Mămăliga
Mihaljča Mihalcea
Miliyeve Ispas
Molnica Molnița
Nedoboivci Nedǎbǎuți
Negrovec Negrovǎț
Nepolokivci Nepolocǎuți
Neresnica Nereșnița
Niž Bystryi Bistra de Jos
Niž Selište Sǎliște
Nov. Broskivci Broșcǎuții Noi
Obertyn Obertin
Odessa Odesa
Oprišenj Oprișeni
Ostrytsia Stârcești
Piscanka Pesceanca
Ploske Plosca
Podvirne Chișia
Putila Putila
Raškiv Râșcov
Rohotin Rahotin
Ropča Ropcea
Roztoki Rǎstoace
Rudnica Rudnița
Sabo Șaba Târg
Savranj Savran
Serghiivka Serghiești
Snjatyn Sâniatin
Sokyryany Secureni Târg
Stara Usica Ușița
Stavčany Stǎuceni
Stefanešty Ștefǎnești
Sterče Stârcea
Šibeny Șibeni
Tarašany Tǎrǎșeni
Tarasivci Tǎrǎsǎuți
Tereblja Talabor
Toporivci Toporǎuți
Toruń Turnu
Turiatka Tuteatca
Uglija Uglea
Ustj-Putila Gura Putilei
Uzgorod Ujgorod
Vaslovivci Vășlăuți
Veliko Kopanja Virișmort
Veliko Kučuriv Cuciuru Mare
Velika Mihajlivka Grosu
Veliko Vučkiv Tribușa
Velikodolinske Liebental
Velykosillia Satu Mare
Verenčanka Vrânceni
Verh Peri
Vilšanj Vulșana
Vikno Ocna
Vodjane Apșa de Sus
Vonjgove Vǎineag
Vradiivka Vrabie
Zatoka Bugaz
Zolotareve Domnești

Other cities
Chornobyl Cernobîl (although it should have been Cernobâl, according to the Romanian phonology)

United Kingdom
Great Britain Marea Britanie
England Anglia
Scotland Scoția
Wales Țara Galilor
Northern Ireland Irlanda de Nord
Thames Tamisa
London Londra

See also 
 List of European exonyms

 
Lists of exonyms
Romanian diaspora